Hamsanandi (pronounced hamsānandi) is a rāgam in Carnatic music (musical scale of South Indian classical music). It is a hexatonic scale (shadava rāgam, which means "of 6"). It is a derived scale (janya rāgam), as it does not have all the seven swaras (musical notes). Hamsanandi is a janya rāgam of Gamanashrama, the 53rd Melakarta rāgam. It has only the invariant panchamam missing from its parent scale, Gamanashrama, like Shree ranjani.

Sohni raga in Hindustani classical music that belongs to the Marwa thaat resembles Hamsanandi.

Structure and Lakshana 

Hamsanandi is a symmetric scale that does not contain panchamam. It is called a shadava-shadava rāgam, in Carnatic music classification (as it has 6 notes in both ascending and descending scales). Its ārohaṇa-avarohaṇa structure is as follows (see swaras in Carnatic music for details on below notation and terms):

ārohaṇa : 
avarohaṇa : 

This scale uses the notes shadjam, shuddha rishabham, antara gandharam, prati madhyamam, chathusruthi dhaivatham and kakali nishadam.

Popular compositions 
Hamsanandi is an evening rāgam. It has ample scope for alapana and swara prasthara (phrases of notes). This scale has been used by many composers for compositions in classical music. It has been used to score film music too. Here are some popular compositions in Hamsanandi.

Paahi jagajanani, Sankara Sreegiri by Swati Tirunal
Srinivasa Thiruvenkata Odeya by Papanasam Sivan
Paavana Guru Pavanapura by Lalitha Dasa
Hantha Njn Enthu is a Padam in Malayalam by Swati Tirunal
Needu Mahima Mogadana' by Muthiah BhagavatarEe pariya Sobagu, Kandena Govindana, Tattatha Dhimitha by Purandara DasaSmarisu Gurugala (Importance and Power of a Guru) By Gopala DasaRanga kolalanoodalaagi by Prasanna venkata dasa in KannadaRaghavendra Rayara Padambuja By Kamalesha Vithala DasuShauriyuro Vasini by Kalyani VaradarajanMeenakshi Jayda varada by [[M. Balamuralikrishna
  Dhimtara Nera Nera,a thillana by Muthiah Bhagavatar

Film Songs
 Language:Tamil 

Related rāgams
This section covers the theoretical and scientific aspect of this rāgam.

Scale similaritiesSunadavinodini is a popular rāgam which sounds similar to Hamsanandi, which does not have the shuddha rishabham. Its ārohaṇa-avarohaṇa'' structure is :

Notes

References

Janya ragas